Siva Nageswara Rao is an Indian film director and screenwriter who works in Telugu cinema. He is especially known for his work in comedy films. His notable films include Money (1993), Money Money (1994), Lucky Chance (1994), Sisindri (1995), Pattukondi Chooddaam (1997), Hands Up! (2000), Dhanalakshmi, I Love You (2002), Mr & Mrs Sailaja Krishnamurthy (2004), Bhookailas (2007).

Early life 
Siva Nageswara Rao was born and brought up in Uppalapadu near Guntur. He was fascinated by films from childhood. He did his graduation from Hindu College in Guntur.

Career 
He went to Madras to join Telugu film industry in 1979 at the age of 23. He struggled there for six months. In order to earn daily living, he acted in films like Burripalem Bullodu and Sannayi Appanna as unofficial junior artist.

He joined as an assistant director to Vijaya Nirmala and worked under her for the films Antham Kaadidi Aarambham, Doctor Cine Actor (1982) etc. Later he worked with V. Madhusudhana Rao for Jagannatha Ratha Chakraalu, with Lenin Babu for Maro Kurukshetram, with S. A. Chandrasekhar for Devanthakudu (1984), Balidaanam, Intiko Rudramma. Then he started working for Kranthi Kumar with Swathi (1984) and was a part of his direction team for six years.

He met Ram Gopal Varma during the making of the film Rao Gaari Illu (1988) on which both Varma and Siva Nageswara Rao worked as assistant directors. While doing that film, Varma asked him to work as an assistant director in Siva (1989) to which he agreed. Siva Nageswara Rao's debut film as a director was Money (1993) and was produced by Ram Gopal Varma.

Filmography 
Director
 Money (1993)
 One by Two (1993)
 Lucky Chance (1994)
 Money Money (1994)
 Sisindri (1995)
 Once More (1996)
 Pattukondi Chooddaam (1997)
 O Panaipotundi Baboo...! (1999)
 Hands Up! (2000)
 Ramana (2002)
 Dhanalakshmi, I Love You (2002)
 Mr & Mrs Sailaja Krishnamurthy (2004)
 Photo (2006)
 Bhookailas (2007)
 Ninnu Kalisaka (2009)
 Over Action (2016)
 Dochevaarevarura (2022)

Actor
 Ninnu Kalisaka (2009)

Awards
 Won Nandi Award for Best First Film of a Director - Money (1993)

References

External links
 

Living people
Film directors from Andhra Pradesh
Telugu film directors
People from Guntur district
1960 births
20th-century Indian film directors
21st-century Indian film directors
Nandi Award winners
Indian film directors